Lance Morris (born 28 March 1998) is an Australian cricketer. 

He was born in Busselton, Western Australia and made his Twenty20 debut on 10 January 2020, for the Melbourne Stars in the 2019–20 Big Bash League season. He made his first-class debut on 10 October 2020, for Western Australia in the 2020–21 Sheffield Shield season. He made his List A debut on 8 April 2021, for Western Australia in the 2020–21 Marsh One-Day Cup.

Morris was added to the Australian Test squad against the West Indies in December 2022.

References

External links
 

1998 births
Living people
Australian cricketers
Melbourne Stars cricketers
Western Australia cricketers
Place of birth missing (living people)
Perth Scorchers cricketers
People from Busselton